Aaron Wilson (born December 20, 1980, in Kitchener, Ontario) is a lacrosse player for the Edmonton Rush in the National Lacrosse League.

Wilson began his career with the Toronto Rock. After six seasons with the Rock, including a Championship in 2005, Wilson was traded to the Rochester Knighthawks. After only six games with the Knighthawks, Wilson was traded again, this time to the Minnesota Swarm for former rookie of the year Craig Point and Dean Hill.

Following the 2011 season, Wilson was traded to the Edmonton Rush along with Ryan Cousins and Kevin Croswell for a number of draft picks.

Statistics

NLL
Reference:

References

1980 births
Living people
Canadian lacrosse players
Edmonton Rush players
Lacrosse people from Ontario
Minnesota Swarm players
National Lacrosse League All-Stars
Rochester Knighthawks players
Sportspeople from Kitchener, Ontario
Toronto Rock players